Cox's roundleaf bat or Cox's leaf-nosed bat (Hipposideros coxi) is a species of bat in the family Hipposideridae. It is endemic to Borneo. All confirmed records are from Sarawak (Malaysia), but it might also occur in Kalimantan (Indonesia).

References

Hipposideros
Bats of Malaysia
Endemic fauna of Malaysia
Endemic fauna of Borneo
Mammals described in 1901
Taxa named by Robert Walter Campbell Shelford
Taxonomy articles created by Polbot